This is a list of Polish contemporary artists:

A B C D E F G H I J K L M N O P R S–Ś T U V W Z–Ż

A
 Magdalena Abakanowicz (1930-2017), sculptor
 Wiesław Adamski (born 1947), sculptor
 Kazimierz Adamski (born 1964), sculptor
 Janusz Akermann (born 1957), painter and professor of Fine Arts in Gdańsk
 Paweł Althamer (born 1967), sculptor, performance artist, installation artist
 Sylwester Ambroziak (born 1964), sculptor

B
 Stanisław Baj (born 1953), painter
 Tomasz Bajer (born 1971), sculptor, visual artist
 Agnieszka Balewska (born 1967), painter, performance artist
 Mirosław Bałka (born 1958), painter, sculptor, installation artist
 Krzysztof Bednarski (born 1953), sculptor
 Zdzisław Beksiński (1929–2005), painter, photographer
 Jan Berdyszak (1934-2014), installation artist
 Kiejstut Bereźnicki (born 1935), painter
 Alicja Buławka-Fankidejska (born 1983), ceramist
 Bogna Burska (born 1974), installation artist
 Agnieszka Brzezańska (born 1972), visual artist
 Józef Bury (born 1961), multidisciplinary artist
 Jerzy Bereś (1930 - 2012), sculptor, multidisciplinary artist

C
 Michał Cała (born 1948), photographer

D
 Jerzy Duda-Gracz (1941–2004), painter
 Kasia Domanska (1972), painter

E

 Stasys Eidrigevičius (born 1949), graphic, photographer

F
 Wojciech Fangor (1922 – 2015), painter
 Waldemar Fydrych (born 1953), performer

G
 Krzysztof Gliszczyński (born 1962), painter
 Peter Grzybowski (born 1954), painter, performer
 Roman Gajewski (born 1954), painter
 Peter Grzybowski (1954 - 2013), multimedia and performance artist, painter

H

 Władysław Hasior (1928–1999), sculptor
 Edward Hartwig (1909–2003), photographer

I
 Miho Iwata (born 1962), performer

J
 Rafał Jakubowicz (born 1974), visual artist
 Janusz Janowski (born 1965), painter
 Zuzanna Janin (born 1961), painter, performer, installation artist
 Aleksander Janicki (born 1963), graphic artist, photographer, performer
 Krzysztof Jung (1951-1998), painter, performer and installation artist

K

 Koji Kamoji (born 1935), painter, installation artist
 Tadeusz Kantor (1915–1990), painter, performer, assemblage artist
 Katarzyna Kobro (1898 - 1951), sculptor
 Piotr Kowalski (1927–2004), sculptor and architect
 Katarzyna Kozyra (born 1963),  photography,  video artist
 Wlodzimierz Ksiazek (1951-2011), abstract painter
 Zofia Kulik (born 1947),  photography, performer
 Robert Kuśmirowski (born 1973), sculptor, performer, installation artist
 Andre de Krayewski (born 1933), painter
 Jarosław Kukowski (born 1972), painter
 Zofia Kulik (born 1947), performer
 Jarosław Kozłowski (born 1945), painter, conceptual artist

L
 Zbigniew Libera (born 1959),  photography, video and installation artist
 Norman Leto (Łukasz Banach), (born 1980), video and visual artist
 Jan Lenica (1928–2001), graphic, designer and cartoonist
 Zbigniew Lengren, cartoonist and illustrator
 Edward Lazikowski (Łazikowski) (born 1939)
 Natalia Lach-Lachowicz (Natalia LL) (born 1937), visual artist, painter
 Lea Lublin (1929 - 1999), performance

M
 Goshka Macuga (born 1967), artist
 Agata Materowicz (born 1963), painter, photographer, graphic designer
 Michal Martychowiec (born 1987),  photography, video and installation artist

N
 Dorota Nieznalska (born 1973), sculptor, photographer

O

 Teofil Ociepka (1891-1978), painter 
 Rafał Olbiński (born 1943), painter, graphic
 Paulina Olowska (born 1976), painter
 Roman Opałka (1931-2011), painter
 Joseph Stanislaus Ostoja-Kotkowski (1922–1994), painter, sculptor, photographer
 Kazimierz Ostrowski (1917–1999), painter

P
 Andrzej Pitynski (born 1947), sculptor
 Jarosław Pijarowski (born 1971), avant-garde artist, musician, photographer, performer
 Emil Polit (born 1940), painter
 Robert Pranagal (born 1969), photographer

R
 Joanna Rajkowska (born 1968), installation artist
 Zofia Rydet (1911 – 1997), photographer

S–Ś
 Joanna Salska, painter
 Henryk Stażewski (1894-1988), painter
 Wilhelm Sasnal (born 1972), painter
 Irene Monat Stern (1932-2010), painter
 Józef Szajna (1922-2008), set designer, director, play writer, theoretician of the theatre, painter and graphic artist 
 Alina Szapocznikow (1926–1973), sculptor
 Marek Szczęsny (born 1939), painter
 Andrzej Szewczyk (1950 - 2001), painter, conceptual artist

T
 Jerzy Tomaszewski (born 1924), artist, reporter and photographer
 Jacek Tylicki (born 1951), conceptual projects

U
 Piotr Uklański (born 1968), photographer, installation artist
Tomasz Urbanowicz (born 1959), architectural glass artist

W

 Ryszard Wasko (born 1947), painter, photographer, video and installation artist
 Jurek Wajdowicz (born 1951), photographer, artist, graphic designer
 Maria Wąsowska (1931-1993), painter, graphic artist specialising in linocut 
 Krzysztof Wodiczko (born 1943), video and installation artist
 Jan de Weryha-Wysoczański (born 1950), sculptor
 Andrzej Wróblewski (1927 - 1957), painter

Z–Ż
 Włodzimierz Zakrzewski (1916–1992), painter
 Artur Żmijewski (born 1966), visual artist, filmmaker and photographer

See also
Art
List of Polish artists
List of Polish graphic designers
List of Polish photographers
List of Polish painters
List of Polish sculptors

.
Contemporary artists
Poland